Turkey competed at the 2022 World Games held in Birmingham, United States from 7 to 17 July 2022.

Competitors
The following is the list of number of competitors in the Games.

Cue sports

Turkey competed in cue sports.

Men

Women

Finswimming

Turkey competed in finswimming.

References

Nations at the 2022 World Games
2022
World Games